The 2019 IHF Emerging Nations Handball Championship was the third edition of the IHF Emerging Nations Championship held in Georgia under the aegis of International Handball Federation from 7 to 16 June 2019.

Georgia defeated Cuba in the final to win their first title and earned the right to compete at the Relegation Round of 2022 European Championship qualification.

A total of twelve countries participated in the tournament.

Venues
The championship were played in Tbilisi, Georgia.

Participating teams
Unlike previous edition, Europe was represented only by the teams who competed at the first phase of 2022 European Championship qualification and failed to advance to the Relegation Round. That implied Faroe Islands not to defend their title at this tournament.

1 Bold indicates champion for that year. Italics indicates host.

Draw
The draw was held on 26 April 2019. Georgia had the right to choose their group after the draw was completed.

Seeding

Preliminary round
All times are local (UTC+4).

Group A

Group B

Knockout stage

Bracket

Fifth place bracket

Ninth place bracket

9–12th place semifinals

5–8th place semifinals

Semifinals

Eleventh place game

Ninth place game

Seventh place game

Fifth place game

Third place game

Final

Final standings

All-Star Team
All-Star Team of the tournament and MVP.

Statistics

Top goalscorers

Source: IHF

Top goalkeepers

Source: IHF

References

External links
Official website
IHF website

2019
International sports competitions hosted by Georgia (country)
IHF Emerging Nations Championship
IHF Emerging Nations Handball Championship
June 2019 sports events in Europe